Serena Williams was the two-time defending champion, but withdrew before her third round match because of a right elbow injury.

Maria Sharapova won her third title in Rome, defeating Spaniard Carla Suárez Navarro in the final, 4–6, 7–5, 6–1.

Seeds
The top eight seeds received a bye into the second round.

Draw

Finals

Top half

Section 1

Section 2

Bottom half

Section 3

Section 4

Qualifying

Seeds

Qualifiers

Lucky losers

Qualifying draw

First qualifier

Second qualifier

Third qualifier

Fourth qualifier

Fifth qualifier

Sixth qualifier

Seventh qualifier

Eighth qualifier

References
Main draw
Qualifying draw

Women's Singles